Coyer Point is an ice-covered headland on the southeast side of the Martin Peninsula. It was mapped by the United States Geological Survey from surveys and from U.S. Navy aerial photographs, 1959–67, and Landsat imagery, 1972–73. It was named by the Advisory Committee on Antarctic Names in 1977 after Lieutenant Ann E. Coyer, U.S. Navy, the first U.S. Navy woman to participate in Antarctic operations, who took part in Operation Deep Freeze, 1974.

References 

Headlands of Marie Byrd Land